Rodolfo Mancuso (born February 28, 1991) is an American Internet personality, musician and actor. He is known for making comedy skits with his friends on YouTube and Vine having 10.6 million followers by the time it shut down making him the 4th most followed Viner and being behind many voices in the YouTube channel, Awkward Puppets.

Early life
Mancuso was raised in Glen Ridge, New Jersey, the son of an Italian-American father and a Brazilian mother, along with a sister, Marianna. He attended Glen Ridge High School and Rutgers University Newark. He lived in Rio de Janeiro for a while and speaks Portuguese fluently. He started playing the piano at the age of five. Mancuso was diagnosed with synesthesia.

Career 

Mancuso started his Vine channel in 2013. He was often known for his Hispanic characters as well as his IRL videos. Mancuso's partnered with Shots Studios to create videos and launched his YouTube channel in 2016.

He has been featured on Comedy Central's Drunk History and HBO's Outpost. He also starred in YouTube Red's Keys of Christmas along with Mariah Carey and DJ Khaled.

Awkward Puppets, a puppet series on the YouTube platform, is owned by Mancuso and Shots Studios.

Mancuso was the opener for Justin Bieber's Purpose World Tour in Brazil's section of his Latin America shows in 2017.

Dolce & Gabbana invited Mancuso to walk in their Milan Men's Fashion Week Spring/Summer 2018 show on June 17, 2017.

Mancuso performed and presented an award at the 2017 MTV Millennial Awards in Mexico.

In July 2017, Mancuso performed at Villa Mix, in Goiânia for two consecutive days. On October 6, 2017, Mancuso released his first single, "Black & White," in collaboration with songwriter/producer Poo Bear. On October 7, 2017 Mancuso performed at the Villa Mix festival in São Paulo.

Mancuso's next single, "Mama", was his first video single without a featured artist. The video, directed by Mancuso, featured Chantel Jeffries, evoked "odd nostalgia", according to Billboard. Mancuso also released an original song coloration with Alesso to the latter's channel.

In 2018, Mancuso directed the music video for Lele Pons' debut solo single "Celoso" and the music video for Alesso's single "REMEDY." Mancuso also directed the music video for O.A.R.'s single "Miss You All The Time" which was released October 2018.

Mancuso collaborated with fellow comedian and musician Simon Rex for the video "Storytelling" which was released on his channel July 2018.

In September 2018, Mancuso joined O.A.R. at Red Rocks Amphitheater in Colorado for a performance.

Mancuso and fellow Shots Studios artist Lele Pons hosted the 2018 Hispanic Heritage Foundation Awards show. The two performed Pons' "Celoso," with Mancuso playing the instrumental on the piano.

In September 2018, Mancuso released his fourth single, "Lento."

In October 2018, Mancuso released "Superhero Therapy" with Lele Pons, Anwar Jibawi, and King Bach. The video is the most recent installment of his super hero series, which has over 68 million views total.

In November 2018, Mancuso both performed and received an award at the 2018 ALMAs. The award was presented by fellow Shots Studios star Alesso. He also performed a cover of Queen's You're My Best Friend in support of Netflix's Bohemian Rhapsody (film) and the Mercury Phoenix Trust which was released to his YouTube channel.

Mancuso also hosted the 'Concert for Tommy's Field', a charity event held at the Orpheum Theater in Los Angeles. Performances included Lele Pons, Bryce Vine, and others.

Mancuso has produced sponsored videos working with companies such as Target and Clif bar which blend music and comedy. He also appeared in a video with basketball star Stephen Curry for Brita water filters.

Discography

Studio albums

Singles

Filmography

Music videos

Film

Series

Television

References

External links 

 
 
 
 Rudy Mancuso on Spotify
 Rudy Mancuso on Kinopoisk

1991 births
Living people
People from Glen Ridge, New Jersey
American people of Italian descent
American people of Brazilian descent
American Internet celebrities
Glen Ridge High School alumni
Male actors of Brazilian descent
American emigrants to Brazil
Vine (service) celebrities
Brazilian American
Brazilian comedians